Corrado Mantoni (2 August 1924 – 8 June 1999), known simply as Corrado, was an Italian radio and television host.

Biography
He was born in Rome, where he followed classic studies and in jurisprudence; before finishing university studies he started to work as radio speaker with EIAR, predecessor of RAI, Italian State Television. He was the first to announce to the Italian public events such as the end of World War II, the birth of the Italian Republic or the death of Trilussa. He also worked as dubber for foreign actors including Jerry Lewis.

In 1949, he was chosen by RAI as their first TV host for the Italian first experimental TV broadcasting. In the 1950s he was the foremost radio host in the country, and also took part in numerous movies as himself.

Corrado began to work for TV in the 1960s as the host of popular shows such as Canzonissima, Miss Italia, the Sanremo Festival (1974) and Domenica In, which he inaugurated in  1976. Another show for which he was the first host was Fantastico. He also worked for the TSI, the Italian-speaking Swiss television. In 1978, together with his collaborator Dora Moroni, had a car accident which obliged her to have several operations.

In 1982 Corrado moved to the private-owner Silvio Berlusconi's network. His shows included Il pranzo è servito and, perhaps his most popular, La corrida, in which he presented amateurs.

He was also a singer, mainly of children songs. His 1981 song "Carletto" topped the Italian hit parade for 11 weeks.
 
Corrado was author nearly of all his shows with the pseudonym of Corima, often in collaboration with his brother Riccardo. He died of lung cancer in Rome in 1999.

References

1924 births
1999 deaths
Male actors from Rome
Italian television presenters
Deaths from lung cancer in Lazio
Italian radio presenters
Italian radio personalities
20th-century Italian male actors
Burials at the Cimitero Flaminio